Doc Watkins (born Brent Watkins; June 11, 1981) is a pianist and singer based in San Antonio, TX. He is the creator and co-host of the weekly radio program Live at Jazz, TX, which is syndicated through Texas Public Radio.  Currently in its third season, Live at Jazz, TX has featured interviews and performances by notable artists such as Kenny Garrett, Jane Monheit, Kevin Eubanks, and Marcia Ball.

Watkins is the owner and founder of Jazz, TX, a restaurant and performance venue located in the Historic Pearl Brewery Complex in San Antonio, TX. He performs there weekly with his Orchestra.

Watkins was born and raised in Oregon and moved to Austin, TX in 2003, where he earned a Master's Degree and PhD in music from the University of Texas. In 2006 he relocated to San Antonio and began performing regularly at local venues on the San Antonio Riverwalk. In January 2014, he performed with his Jazz Trio at New York City's Carnegie Hall. In 2016, Watkins opened his own venue, Jazz, TX, where he performs regularly with his band.

In 2020, Watkins hosted and co-produced The Doc Watkins Show, a live stream television program that ran for 45 episodes during the COVID-19 pandemic. The show featured Watkins and his band, with remote guest appearances from Kevin Eubanks, Jane Monheit, Alan Havey, Brent Barry, Champian Fulton, Jerry Weldon, Mayor Ron Nirenberg and others. The show was awarded "Best Live Stream Experience" by San Antonio Magazine in 2021. 

Watkins has performed with Herlin Riley, Kevin Eubanks, Butch Miles, Jim Cullum, Ephraim Owens, Stan Mark, Landau Eugene Murphy Jr, Bijon Watson, Leon Hughes, and Renee Olstead. He currently resides in San Antonio, TX with his wife Jessica and their four children.

Discography

Albums 

 2005 – The Classical Concert
2011 – Live from Bohanan's
2014 – The Outlaw
 2015 – A Willie Nelson Tribute
 2015 – Swinging from San Antonio
 2015 – Doc Watkins and his Orchestra (EP)
 2017 – Jazz, TX
2018 – Christmas in Jazz, TX
2019 – Songs of 2019
2022 – The Music of A Charlie Brown Christmas

References

External links 
 Official Website
 

1981 births
Living people
Musicians from Oregon
Musicians from San Antonio
American male pianists
21st-century American pianists
21st-century American male musicians